Karl-Heinz Menz (born 17 December 1949) is a German former biathlete who competed in the 1976 Winter Olympics.

References

1949 births
Living people
German male biathletes
Olympic biathletes of East Germany
Biathletes at the 1976 Winter Olympics
Olympic bronze medalists for East Germany
Olympic medalists in biathlon
Medalists at the 1976 Winter Olympics